The 1888 United States presidential election in Florida took place on November 6, 1888. All contemporary 38 states were part of the 1888 United States presidential election. Florida voters chose four electors to the Electoral College, which selected the president and vice president.

Florida was won by the Democratic nominees, incumbent President Grover Cleveland of New York and his running mate Allen G. Thurman of Ohio.

This was the last election until 2020 that Florida increased its margin to an incumbent who lost re-election nationally.

Results

References

Notes

Florida
1888
1888 Florida elections